Sonora is an extinct town in Atchison County, in the U.S. state of Missouri. The GNIS classifies it as a populated place.

Sonora was laid out in 1846. A post office called Sonora was established in 1872, and closed in 1875.

References

Ghost towns in Missouri
Former populated places in Atchison County, Missouri